Syrmoptera bonifacei, commonly known as Boniface's false head, is a species of butterfly in the family Lycaenidae, named for Boniface Watulege. It is found in Nigeria (the eastern part of the country and the Cross River loop), Cameroon, and the Republic of the Congo. The habitat consists of forests.

References

External links
 

Butterflies described in 1961
Theclinae